The Plan of Casa Mata (Spanish: Plan de Casa Mata) was formulated to elect a new constituent congress, which the monarchy of Agustín de Iturbide, had dissolved in 1822. The Plan of Casa Mata sought to establish a republic.

In December 1822, Antonio López de Santa Anna and Guadalupe Victoria signed the Plan de Casa Mata on February 1, 1823, as a beginning to their efforts to overthrow Emperor Agustín de Iturbide. Iturbide had formulated the Plan of Iguala in 1821, which united insurgents and royalist forces and Mexico's independence in September 1821. The plan called for a constitutional monarchy, and when no European monarch presented himself as a candidate, the Mexican Congress proclaimed Iturbide as Emperor of Mexico in May 1822. Commanding the country as he had commanded the army, he dissolved the Congress and ordered dissidents imprisoned.

Several insurrections arose in the provinces and were choked by the army, except for the one headed by Santa Anna in Veracruz, because he had an agreement with General Echávarri, who commanded the imperial forces that fought Santa Anna. By agreement of the two the Plan de Casa Mata was proclaimed on February 1, 1823. This plan did not recognize the First Mexican Empire and called for a new Constituent Congress. The insurrectionists sent their proposal to the provincial delegations and requested their support for the plan. In the course of only six weeks, the Plan de Casa Mata had arrived at remote places, like Texas, and almost all the provinces had been united behind the plan.

When a provincial delegation accepted the Plan de Casa Mata, it withdrew its allegiance from the imperial government and asserted sovereignty within its province. Agustín de Iturbide was isolated without support outside of Mexico City and some factions of the army. He reinstated the dissolved constituent Congress, abdicated the crown, and left the country in March 1823, for Italian exile with the promise of a 25,000 peso annual payment if he remained there. The 1824 Constitution was adopted the following year.

Articles

See also
Plans in Mexican history
History of democracy in Mexico

Further reading
 Anna, Timothy. The Mexican Empire of Iturbide. Lincoln: University of Nebraska Press 1990.
 Benson, Nettie Lee. "The Plan of Casa Mata." Hispanic American Historical Review 25 (February 1945): 45-56.
 Hamnett, Brian R. Roots of Insurgency: Mexican Regions, 1750-1824. Cambridge and New York: Cambridge University Press 1986.
 Robertson, William Spence. Iturbide of Mexico. Durham: Duke University Press 1952.
 Rodríguez O. Jaime E. "Plan of Casa Mata" in Encyclopedia of Latin American History and Culture, vol. 2, p. 1. New York: Charles Scribner's Sons 1996.

Independent Mexico
Mexican Empire
Casa Mata
1822 in Mexico
1823 in Mexico
1822 documents